Serge Djelloul (born 28 March 1966) is a French former ice hockey defenceman. He competed in the men's tournament at the 1998 Winter Olympics.

References

External links

1966 births
Living people
Brûleurs de Loups players
Dragons de Rouen players
Essen Mosquitoes players
French ice hockey defencemen
Gothiques d'Amiens players
Graz 99ers players
Ice hockey players at the 1998 Winter Olympics
Olympic ice hockey players of France
Sportspeople from Haute-Savoie